Peter O'Sullivan may refer to:
 Peter O'Sullivan (Australian footballer) (1932–1972), Australian rules footballer
 Peter O'Sullivan (hurler) (born 1943), Irish hurler
 Peter O'Sullivan (Welsh footballer) (born 1951), Welsh international footballer

See also
 Peter O'Sullevan (1918–2015), British horse racing commentator
 Peter Sullivan (disambiguation)